Nicholas Howard Peters (21 February 1968 – 20 May 2019) was an English cricketer who played first-class cricket for Surrey in 1988 and 1989.

Nick Peters was born in Guildford in Surrey and educated at Sherborne School in Dorset. A right-arm fast-medium bowler, he had one outstanding match, when he took 6 for 31 and 4 for 36 as Surrey beat Warwickshire by an innings and 43 runs in 1988.

After his short cricket career, Peters taught at Framlingham College and Trinity School, then undertook a career as a clinical psychotherapist, which included work at the Priory Hospital in Roehampton and Maudsley Hospital in London, and in private practice in London. He died of cancer.

References

External links
 

1968 births
English cricketers
Surrey cricketers
2019 deaths
Sportspeople from Guildford
People educated at Sherborne School
Deaths from cancer in England